Panasonic Lumix DMC-GX9 is a digital rangefinder-styled mirrorless interchangeable-lens camera announced by Panasonic in February, 2018.

Described as "most readily compared to the GX80," it features a 20 megapixel sensor, 5-axis image stabilization, Depth from Defocus (DFD) contrast-detect AF, a 3.0-inch tiltable touchscreen LCD and a tilting 2.76M-dot electronic viewfinder. The camera's ISO range is from 200 to 25600 and it features up to 6 frames per second burst shooting with continuous auto focus. The camera records 4K video at 30fps. It was named one of the best Panasonic cameras in 2023 by Digital Camera World.

Gallery

References

Panasonic cameras
Digital cameras